Enver Jääger (born 28 October 1982 in Kohila) is a former Estonian footballer. He was a striker, and is 1.80 m tall. He played two games for the Estonia national football team.

Personal
He has a younger brother, Enar Jääger, who plays football for Vålerenga Fotball on loan from FC Flora.

External links

1982 births
Living people
People from Kohila
Viljandi JK Tulevik players
FC Valga players
FC Flora players
Estonian footballers
Estonia international footballers
Association football forwards